Senator Dore may refer to:

Fred H. Dore (1925–1996), Washington State Senate
John Clark Dore (1822–1900), New Hampshire State Senate